A panic attack is an episode of intense fear and discomfort.

Panic attack may refer to:

"Panic Attack" (song), by The Paddingtons
"Panic Attack", a song from Dream Theater's 2005 album Octavarium
"Panic Attack!", a song from The Fall of Troy's 2009 album In the Unlikely Event
Panic Attack (EP), by Grinspoon
Panic Attack (robot) from TV series Robot Wars
Ataque de pánico! (Spanish for Panic Attack!), a 2009 science fiction short film about a robot attack on Montevideo, Uruguay